Rolv Einar Rasmussen Ryssdal (27 October 1914 – 18 February 1998) was a Norwegian judge.

From 1969 to 1984 he was the 16th Chief Justice of the Supreme Court. He was Vice President of the European Court of Human Rights from 1981 to 1985 and President from 1985 to 1998.

He was married to Signe Marie Stray Ryssdal, and father of noted lawyer Anders Christian Stray Ryssdal.

Rolv Ryssdal was appointed Commander with Star of the Order of St. Olav in 1970. He was decorated with the Grand Cross in 1985.

In 1993 he was awarded the Fritt Ord Award.

References

1914 births
1998 deaths
Chief justices of Norway
Presidents of the European Court of Human Rights
Norwegian judges of international courts and tribunals
Stray family